is a word in the Samoan language for a female-specific tattoo of cultural significance. The  takes its name from a particular motif of the same name, usually tattooed in the popliteal fossa (sometimes referred to as the kneepit, or poplit) behind the knee. It is one of the key motifs not seen on men. According to Samoan scholar Albert Wendt and tattooist Su'a Suluape Paulo II, in tattooing, the term  refers to notions of sheltering and protection. Samoan women were also tattooed on the hands and sometimes the lower abdomen. These practices have undergone a resurgence since the late 1990s.

Changing significance  

However, in 1930, anthropologist Te Rangi Hiroa observed that "...the tattooing of a girl is often used as an opportunity for a student to try his prentice hand. This is also rendered possible by the fact that there is no fusita (fine mat) passed or any of the ceremony that marks the tattooing of the male. It is often sufficient reward for the novice to have the opportunity of practice and to be well fed during the period occupied by the operation...For the daughter of a high chief, who is to become the village taupou, it can be readily understood that an expert artist would be requisitioned and his reward greater."

Ceremonial roles are still important in Samoan society and are restricted in similar ways to particular people with the correct qualifications and cultural knowledge, but the significance of the  has shifted. In the Samoan congregations of some churches, men and women have been discouraged from getting tattooed. It is clear from these public debates that the changes in meaning for all forms of Samoan tattooing are being made by the people who wear the images as much as by the tattooists who create them.

Non-Samoans and the  
One relates to an American named Elsie Bach who worked as a Peace Corps volunteer in Samoa in the 1970s. This practice is controversial and is sometimes criticised as cultural appropriation by Samoans.

References

External links
Skin Stories, PBS.

Polynesian tattooing
Samoan culture
Samoan words and phrases
Tattoo designs